Nor Ughi is a village in the Vedi Municipality of the Ararat Province of Armenia. It literally means new way in Armenian. It was developed around the Vedi Wine Factory operating since 1956.

References 

Populated places in Ararat Province